Sexecutioner is a supporting character in the heavy metal band Gwar, played originally by Mike Delaney, and finally  by Chuck Varga from 1989 until 1995–6, with special appearances in 2000 (the You're All Worthless and Weak concert), 2012, and 2014. He sang lead on his trademark song, "Sexecutioner", and "Ragnarok".

There are conflicting origin stories of the Sexecutioner - the Slave Pit Funnies (from 1989–90) suggest that he was summoned in an ancient ritual by Oderus, and was raised from infancy to become Scumdog material. The song "Sexecutioner" bluntly states that he is from France (hence the French accent). Earlier incarnations of Gwar's website (pre-dating 2004, when the website underwent a drastic overhaul) state that he was from the planet Eros, in the Genital V System, and that even he doesn't know his own age.

During his time with the band his stage role was similar to that of a slave, in that he assisted Oderus Urungus in fighting the band's enemies. Unlike the slaves, he was treated as a member of the band (with a similar role as Slymenstra Hymen).

Varga, after designing the most frequently seen Sexecutioner mask (the first full head mask for the band), worked with Dave Brockie on Oderus' mask, which has remained largely unchanged since its inception in late 1989.

Chuck Varga remains a member of the Slave Pit, the group behind Gwar, though does not work with them (Varga, along with Hunter Jackson, Dave Brockie and Don Drakulich were the founders of Slave Pit). He retired from touring in 1995 (Varga was the oldest member of Slave Pit Inc., and touring became physically stressful, especially on his knees), but worked part-time until 2001. For a number of years following his departure, he worked with Don Drakulich (Sleazy P. Martini), who had also retired from touring, in a special effects company.

According to Drakulich (who answered this question on Bohab Central, a prominent Gwar fansite, on January 13, 2007), the term "bohab" was, in part, invented by Varga - initially, it was a nickname for a socially inept friend of Hunter Jackson's (named Bob), invented by Dave Musel; after hearing him say this (he was in the room when this happened), "He instantly shortened it by getting rid of the Slohab then coined as part of the Slave-Pit lexicon to refer to anyone who is socially awkward, who drones on about trivial matters while boring all those around him. In particular it refers to those who are tedious talkers who refuse to let bored body language and avoidance by others stop their persistently friendly overtures - now known as bohabery. Bohabs are not losers who chose to be loners. Bohabs are losers who are persistently friendly."

According to GWAR's website, The Sexecutioner was to return for the 2012 GWARBQ. It was unknown if this marked a permanent return of the character, or if he would be portrayed by Varga.
The Sexecutioner did appear at the fifth GWARBQ after the death of Dave Brockie, taking vocals of one song, "Sexecutioner". It is currently unclear how permanent this return is.

References 

Gwar members